Topolovățu Mare is a commune in Timiș County, Romania. It is composed of six villages: Cralovăț, Ictar-Budinț, Iosifalău, Șuștra, Topolovățu Mare (commune seat) and Topolovățu Mic.

Name

History 

Until recently, the first recorded mention of Topolovățu Mare was considered to date from 1717, with the mention that it was most likely established during the Turkish occupation. More recent research, published in the Monograph of Topolovăț commune, published under the coordination of Viorel Boldureanu, shows that the locality is mentioned in a Turkish defter from 1554, with the name Topolovăț. The same source supports the hypothesis that the village moved to the nearby hill and took the name Kustelek (the toponym still exists today), which appears in a deed of donation of Sigismund Báthory in 1597.

After the expulsion of the Turks from Banat, the Austrians found the village of Topolovac with 40 houses on the current site. In the meantime, the village had descended to the roads in the valley and stabilized as a settlement at the crossroads between the Timișoara–Lugoj road and the old road leading from Buziaș to Lipova. From the time of the Turks, there would have been a stop for stagecoaches here and it is known that in 1767 there was a post office here. At the same time, there was a tax office here, which indicates the importance of the locality.

Started in 1728, the works on the Bega Canal advanced in time upstream of Timișoara. When it was found that navigation on the canal was negatively affected by the oscillation of water flow, Dutch engineer , who designed the Bega Canal, proposed the construction of technical nodes to be located at Topolovăț and Coștei, in order to connect Timiș and Bega and to allow the transfer of water between the two rivers. At the same time, the nodes would have improved the land and prevented flooding. Therefore, the construction of the hydrotechnical node at Topolovăț began in 1758 and was completed in 1760, in a record time. The node is a unique engineering monument for that period and has functioned to this day. In order to ensure the labor force, the labor colonies from Coșteiu Mic (for the node at Coștei) and Topolovățu Mic (for the note at Topolovăț) were established then. The colony was located on the left bank of the Bega and is attested as a village in 1783. In fact, its inhabitants were also Romanians from Topolovățu Mare, as evidenced by ethnographic research, by the very close family ties that exist today and the cultural similarities. 

In 1828, Topolovățu Mare was officially separated from Topolovățu Mic as two separate entities. In the local language, the mononym Topolovăț for Topolovățu Mare has been kept, while Topolovățu Mic is called Sămăiuda. Until 1848 Topolovățu Mare was a property of the Aerarium. It has developed as a stopping point on the road that connected Timișoara with Lugoj, especially after the construction of the railway.

Demographics 

Topolovățu Mare had a population of 2,574 inhabitants at the 2011 census, down 13% from the 2002 census. Most inhabitants are Romanians (84.58%), larger minorities being represented by Serbs (5.44%), Slovaks (2.49%), Roma (1.98%) and Hungarians (1.17%). For 3.26% of the population, ethnicity is unknown. By religion, most inhabitants are Orthodox (78.44%), but there are also minorities of Pentecostals (5.63%), Roman Catholics (5.52%), Serbian Orthodox (4.62%) and Greek Catholics (1.36%). For 3.26% of the population, religious affiliation is unknown.

References 

Communes in Timiș County
Localities in Romanian Banat